Fine by Me may refer to:
Fine by Me (organization), LGBT group
"Fine by Me" (Andy Grammer song)
"Fine by Me" (Chris Brown song)